Stefanko v Doherty and Maritime Hotel Ltd [2019] IRLR 322 (EAT) is a UK labour law case, concerning unfair dismissal and discrimination.

Facts
Stefanko and two other colleagues, Woronowicz and Jonik who were originally from Poland claimed that they were unfairly dismissed, had not been paid wages, not been paid holiday pay, not been given written statements of their employment contracts, and suffered race discrimination from their employers at the Maritime Hotel in Weymouth. Two weeks after the Brexit poll, Woronowicz asked for her wages to be paid correctly and a manager, Mr Nicholas Doherty, told her “Fuck off from my hotel and take your Polish friends with you”. When Jonik and Stefanko subsequently approached Doherty, he mimicked a Polish accent. The claimants then were forced to pack their bags and leave the following morning. The employers argued that there was no dismissal, that it was not unfair, that they had paid wages fully, and that there was no race discrimination. 
Tribunal held that there was unfair dismissal, unlawful wage deductions, and failure to pay holiday pay, but not enough evidence of race discrimination.

Judgment
The Employment Appeal Tribunal, with Stacey J giving judgment, held that there was sufficient evidence of race discrimination, and that the burden of proof was on the employer to show otherwise. Stacey J said the following:

See also

UK labour law

Notes

References

United Kingdom labour case law